Chapu may refer to:

Geography
Chapu, Iran, a village in West Azerbaijan Province, Iran
Zhapu, formerly romanized as Chapu, a seaport in China

People
Henri Chapu (1833–1891), French sculptor
Andrés Nocioni (born 1979), Philadelphia 76ers forward nicknamed "Chapu"
Chapu (entertainer), stage name of Chilean entertainer Francisco Javier Puelles Gana (born 1984)

Other uses
Chapo (beverage), Peruvian beverage made from boiled plantain with cinnamon and clove
Battle of Chapu, fought between British and Chinese forces in Chapu (Zhapu), China, in 1842 during the First Opium War